Prime number theory may refer to:

 Prime number
 Prime number theorem
 Number theory

See also 
Fundamental theorem of arithmetic, which explains prime factorization.